Exclusive is a 1937 American drama film directed by Alexander Hall and written by Jack Moffitt, Sidney Salkow and  Rian James. The film stars Fred MacMurray, Frances Farmer, Charlie Ruggles, Lloyd Nolan, Fay Holden and Ralph Morgan. The film was released on August 6, 1937, by Paramount Pictures.

Plot

Cleared of a crime, gangster Charles Gillette seeks vengeance against Mountain City townspeople who sought to put him behind bars, including Colonel Bogardus, owner of the influential Mountain City World newspaper. Gillette buys the Sentinel, rival to the World, and tries to hire star reporter Ralph Houston to be his editor, but Ralph declines.

Gillette then uses Ralph's girlfriend, Vina Swain, to dig up dirt on his enemies. A story on mayoral candidate Horace Mitchell smears his reputation and results in a suicide. Tod Swain, an editor at the World, chastises Vina for her poor judgment. Gillette then sets out to ruin a department store owner by having henchman Beak McArdle arrange an elevator accident that causes deaths as well as serious injury to Ralph.

Vina's own life is in peril when Gillette then orders McArdle to murder her so she can never tell what she knows. Tod helps her return safely, then tricks Gillette into a confession about the elevator accident. The Sentinel is sold to the town, with a recovered Ralph deciding to run it.

Cast 
Fred MacMurray as Ralph Houston
Frances Farmer as Vina Swain
Charlie Ruggles as Tod Swain
Lloyd Nolan as Charles Gillette
Fay Holden as Mrs. Swain
Ralph Morgan as Horace Mitchell
Edward H. Robins as Colonel Bogardus
Harlan Briggs as Springer
Willard Robertson as Mr. Franklin 
Horace McMahon as Beak McArdle
William Mansell as Formby
Steve Pendleton as Elliott
Chester Clute as Garner
Irving Bacon as Dr. Boomgarten
Frank Bruno as Lollipop
James Blakeley as Mr. Walton
Sam Hayes as Radio Announcer

Reception 
Writing for Night and Day in 1937, Graham Greene gave the film a mildly good review, noting that it gives "the general impression [...] of slow old-fashioned sentiment [whose] result, like lavender, is not unagreeable". Characterizing the film as "a routine film of American newspaper life", Greene gave mixed reactions to the scenes, praising the elevator crash scene but finding himself disappointed by the precious delivery of the final scenes with the daughter speaking of her dead father. A reviewer in The New York Times  found the film's portrayal of newspapermen "authentic" and its story "engrossing".

References

External links 
 

1937 films
Paramount Pictures films
American drama films
Films about journalists
1937 drama films
Films directed by Alexander Hall
American black-and-white films
1930s English-language films
1930s American films